Devils Couch is a  mountain summit located in the Valhalla Ranges of the Selkirk Mountains in southeast British Columbia, Canada. The mountain's descriptive name refers to its shape. It was first called "The Toboggan Slide" by early miners who arrived in the area in the 1890s. It was later called "King Tuts Couch" in the 1920s, coinciding with the archaeological discovery in Egypt. This peak's current name was officially adopted July 22, 1964, by the Geographical Names Board of Canada. The peak is located in Devils Range, which is a compact subrange of the Valhallas. The names of the neighboring peaks have a devil-related theme: Black Prince Mountain, Lucifer Peak, Mount Mephistopheles, Devils Dome, Mount Diablo, Satan Peak, and Devils Spire.

Climate 

Based on the Köppen climate classification, Devils Couch has a subarctic climate with cold, snowy winters, and mild summers. Winter temperatures can drop below −20 °C with wind chill factors below −30 °C. Precipitation runoff from the mountain drains into Gwillim Creek and Evans Creek, both tributaries of the Slocan River.

See also
 
 Geography of British Columbia

References

External links
 Weather forecast: Devils Couch  
 Flickr photo: Devils Couch and Devils Spire

Two-thousanders of British Columbia
Selkirk Mountains
Kootenay Land District